Khalifeh Ha or Khalifehha may refer to:
 Khalifehha, Fars
 Khalifeh Ha, Kermanshah